Taly is a rural locality (a settlement) in Alexandrovskoye Urban Settlement, Alexandrovsky District, Perm Krai, Russia. The population was 17 as of 2010. There are 11 streets.

Geography 
Taly is located 26 km southeast of Alexandrovsk (the district's administrative centre) by road. Severny Kospashsky is the nearest rural locality.

References 

Rural localities in Alexandrovsky District